Philip of Cleves (1 January 1467 – 5 March 1505) was a son of John I, duke of Cleves, and Elizabeth of Nevers.  After several minor ecclesiastical posts, Philip was bishop of Nevers from 1500 until his death.  He was also bishop of Amiens from 1501 to 1503 and in 1505 he was bishop of Autun for a short time.

External links 
 

16th-century French Roman Catholic bishops
People from the Duchy of Cleves
1467 births
1505 deaths
15th-century German people
16th-century German people